Main Street Arkansas is a program for downtown revitalization in Arkansas.  It is a program of the Arkansas Historic Preservation Program, an agency of the Department of Arkansas Heritage.  Main Street Arkansas works through the 4-Point approach to downtown revitalization - Design, Organization, Promotion and Economic Restructuring.  This format is trademarked by the National Trust for Historic Preservation's Main Street Center, which was founded in 1980.

External links
 Official Main Street Arkansas page on Arkansas Historic Preservation Program website

Government of Arkansas